Chalcosyrphus (Xylotomima) metallifer  (Bigot, 1884), the Orange-horned Leafwalker, is a rare species of syrphid fly observed in the Eastern United States. Hoverflies can remain nearly motionless in flight. The adults are also known as flower flies for they are commonly found on flowers, from which they get both energy-giving nectar and protein-rich pollen.

Distribution
Canada, United States.

References

Eristalinae
Insects described in 1884
Diptera of North America
Hoverflies of North America
Taxa named by Jacques-Marie-Frangile Bigot